The Sarasota Classic Car Museum is located at 5500 North Tamiami Trail, Sarasota, Florida, United States. It houses about 100 vintage cars of all types in a  facility with constantly rotating collection. The museum displays rare cars and ones owned by famous people.

The museum has an Italian Car Collection which includes cars from Alfa Romeo, Ferrari, and Rivolta.

Notes

External links
 Sarasota Classic Car Museum (official website)

Automobile museums in Florida
Museums in Sarasota, Florida
1953 establishments in Florida
Museums established in 1953